Dave Giffard (born August 29, 1975) is an American soccer coach. Giffard was raised in Illinois, where he attended MacMurray College from 1993 to 1997, and played for the school's soccer team as a goalkeeper. After finishing college at MacMurray, with a Bachelor's degree in physical education, Giffard immediately went into the sport as a coach, coaching at various institutions as an assistant coach or goalkeeping coach for the next 15 years. Following his tenure as an assistant at MacMurray, Giffard was an assistant on the Westminster College Blue Jays, where they achieved their first 12-win season in program history. During his final years at Westminster, Giffard enrolled for postgraduate studies at the University of Alabama at Birmingham (UAB).

While at UAB, Giffard earned his Master of Arts in Education, achieving his master's at the end of the 2002–03 academic year. Following his achievement, Giffard joined the UAB Blazers men's soccer program as an assistant to Mike Getman. At UAB, Giffard primarily worked as a goalkeeping coach. During his time at UAB, Clint Baumstark became the first goalkeeper at UAB to be capped by the United States U-20 national soccer team.

Upon leaving UAB, Giffard served as volunteer for Indiana University before joining Caleb Porter and the Akron Zips men's soccer program. During Giffard's time as an assistant to Porter, the Zips had a 23–1–1 season, and won the 2010 NCAA Division I Men's Soccer Championship, beating Louisville.

Starting in 2010, Giffard earned his first head coaching position in his career, becoming the head coach for the VCU Rams men's soccer program. In his three years, Giffard returned the Rams to the NCAA Tournament for the first time since 2004, and had the team nationally ranked for the first time since 2005.

Head coaching record

Honors 
 Atlantic 10 Conference Men's Soccer Coach of the Year: 2018

References

External links
http://www.caasports.com/ViewArticle.dbml?DB_OEM_ID=8500&ATCLID=204863728
VCU Rams bio

1976 births
Living people
American soccer coaches
American soccer players
Association football goalkeepers
Akron Zips men's soccer coaches
MacMurray Highlanders men's soccer players
Indiana Hoosiers men's soccer coaches
People from Jacksonville, Illinois
Soccer players from Illinois
UAB Blazers men's soccer coaches
VCU Rams men's soccer coaches
Association football goalkeeping coaches